The 1934–35 season was the 40th season of competitive football by Southampton, and the club's 13th in the Second Division of the Football League. The season was the Saints' worst league campaign since they were promoted to the second flight in 1923, as they finished in 19th place just two places and eight points above the relegation spots. With a lack of high-scoring forwards and injuries to players across the squad, the side struggled to pick up wins throughout the season; in the first half of the campaign, they continued their run without an away win that had encompassed the whole of the previous season, finally ending it after 33 winless fixtures with victory over Swansea Town on Christmas Day 1934. Southampton finished the season with 11 wins, 12 draws and 19 losses – their lowest win rate since the 1911–12 season.

In the 1934–35 FA Cup, Southampton entered the third round with an away fixture against Third Division North side Walsall, who they beat 2–1 thanks to a brace from Laurie Fishlock. In their first fourth round fixture since 1926–27, the Saints lost 0–3 to First Division strugglers Birmingham, in front of a new club record attendance of 28,291. As in previous seasons, the club ended the season with two local tournaments: the Hampshire Combination Cup and the combined Benevolent and Rowland Hospital Cups. In the former, the Saints lost 2–4 at Bournemouth & Boscombe Athletic in the semi-final. In the latter, they also lost to top-flight rivals Portsmouth, who scored the only goal of the game. Southampton's only friendly match during the 1934–35 campaign saw them drawing 2–2 with French side Le Havre AC in March.

Southampton used 23 different players during the 1934–35 season and had 13 different goalscorers. Their top scorer was left winger Laurie Fishlock, who scored seven goals in the Second Division and two in the FA Cup. Centre-forward Norman Cole scored eight times in the league, followed by centre-half Johnny McIlwaine on seven league goals during the campaign. Nine players were signed by the club during the season, with six released and sold to other clubs. The average attendance at The Dell during the 1934–35 season was 9,118. The highest attendance of the season was 28,291 in the FA Cup against Birmingham; the highest attendance in the league was significantly lower – 18,351 against Swansea Town on Boxing Day. The lowest attendance of the season was 4,800 against Notts County on 22 September.

Background and transfers
With mounting financial problems, transfer activity was limited for Southampton ahead of the 1934–35 season. At the end of the previous campaign, two amateur players – inside-left Herbert Coates and inside-right Vivian Gibbins – left to join Athenian League side Leyton. Outside-left Ben Burley, who had made his first-team debut in the last two games of the previous season, also left in June for Grimsby Town, who had recently been promoted to the First Division. Another inside-left out of contention, Tom Ruddy, left for Spennymoor United in the North Eastern League the next month. Both left-sided forward positions were targeted as part of the club's only two signings prior to the start of the season – Alf Wheeler joined from Northampton Town in July and Doug Rowe moved to The Dell from Lincoln City in August.

Southampton's headline signing came just after the start of the league campaign, however, as Laurie Fishlock was brought in from Millwall (who had been relegated from the Second Division last season) as first choice outside-left in September. James Horton also joined from Millwall around the same time, although only made one appearance during the season at centre-forward in the FA Cup fourth round against Birmingham the following January. Also in September, Joe Cummins – who had joined less than a year earlier but made just one appearance during the campaign before succumbing to injury – left to join French club CA Paris-Charenton. In October, after just two months at the club, Rowe also left for France when he joined US Tourquennoise, having lost in place in the starting lineup upon Fishlock's arrival. With the club struggling to score goals in the league, in December they signed Walter Pollard from Fulham, for whom he had failed to make an appearance; he played regularly in both inside-forward roles in the second half of the season, but only scored one goal. Bob Reid also joined on amateur terms from Southwick in Sussex, turning professional the next month and making one appearance in the FA Cup fourth round fixture.

Players transferred in

Players transferred out

Second Division

Southampton begun the 1934–35 league campaign as poorly as they had ended the previous, picking up just two points from their first five games in home draws with fellow mid-table sides Port Vale and Oldham Athletic, to find themselves at the bottom end of the table. In the return leg against Port Vale at the Old Recreation Ground, debutant winger Laurie Fishlock scored the only Saints goal in a 1–4 loss, which was followed a few days later by a 0–4 thrashing at the hands of Bolton Wanderers. The club's sole win in their first ten games came against Hull City, who they beat 3–0 thanks to goals from Bill Adams, Tom Brewis and Fishlock. A surprise 1–0 win over eventual league champions Brentford in October and a convincing 4–1 victory over Bradford Park Avenue a couple of weeks later (in which recent arrival Alf Wheeler scored a hat-trick) saw the team move away from the relegation spots, but by mid-December they were back just one point above the drop zone after picking up a solitary point from their next five fixtures.

In the Christmas week, Southampton beat Bury 2–1 at home, then ended their 33-game streak without an away win on Christmas Day, when they scored the only goal of the game against Swansea Town (a feat which they repeated at home the next day). After moving up to 12th in the league after a 2–0 win at Oldham Athletic on 5 January, Southampton began to plummet back down the league table with a winless run extending into late-March, including a 1–3 loss at bottom-ranked Notts County, a season-record 1–6 defeat at the hands of mid-table Sheffield United, and home losses against Barnsley and Nottingham Forest. By the time they won their next game, 1–0 against Plymouth Argyle at The Dell on 30 March 1935, Southampton were struggling in 20th place in the league table, just six points above the first relegation spot. The club won their last three home fixtures of the season, against Newcastle United, Manchester United and Blackpool, to ensure their safety in the Second Division with a 19th-place finish.

List of match results

Final league table

Results by matchday

FA Cup

Southampton were drawn in the third round of the 1934–35 FA Cup against Third Division North side Walsall. The hosts went ahead through Gilbert Alsop, but the Saints responded through a Laurie Fishlock brace to win for the first time in the tournament since 1927. In the fourth round, the Saints hosted First Division side Birmingham, attracting a new club record attendance of 28,291. With their top goalscorer Fishlock injured, however, the side lacked firepower as he was replaced by young amateur Bob Reid, who was described by club historians as "overawed by the experience". Birmingham won the game 3–0, scoring two goals in the first half and the third in the second, as Southampton were knocked out of the fourth round, to which they didn't return until after the Second World War.

Other matches
Outside of the league and the FA Cup, Southampton played three additional first-team matches during the 1934–35 season. The first was a friendly against French club Le Havre AC on 5 March 1935, which ended in a 2–2 draw including goals from Arthur Holt and Fred Tully. The next month, the team played the semi-final of the third annual Hampshire Combination Cup against Bournemouth & Boscombe Athletic at Dean Court. Despite struggling towards the bottom of the division below the Saints, the Third Division South hosts won the game 4–2 to advance to the final of the competition, with Johnny McIlwaine scoring both consolations for the visitors. In the final game of the season, four days after the league had concluded, the Saints lost 0–1 at Portsmouth for the 1935 combined Hampshire Benevolent Cup and Rowland Hospital Cup. Septimus Rutherford scored the only goal of the game in front of a lacklustre crowd of 2,215, extending Southampton's winless run in the competition to six years.

Player details

Southampton used 23 different players during the 1934–35 season, thirteen of whom scored during the campaign. The team played in a 2–3–5 formation throughout, using two full-backs, three half-backs, two outside forwards, two inside forwards and a centre-forward. Outside-right Fred Tully appeared in all but two of the club's league games during the campaign, followed by right-back Charlie Sillett who played in 39 league and both FA Cup games. Outside-left Laurie Fishlock finished as the season's top scorer with seven goals in the Second Division and two in the FA Cup, followed by centre-forward Norman Cole on eight goals, then centre-half Johnny McIlwaine on seven.

Squad statistics

Most appearances

Top goalscorers

Footnotes

References

Bibliography

External links
Southampton F.C. official website

Southampton F.C. seasons
Southampton